Zelman Isaevich Passov (Russian: Зельман Исаевич Пассов; 1905 in Staraya Russa, Russian Empire – 15 February 1940) was a Soviet security officer who headed the Soviet foreign intelligence service, then part of the NKVD from June to November 1938. In October 1938, when he was arrested on charges of "participating in an anti-Soviet conspiracy". He was shot on the night of February 15, 1940.

He was executed a year and a half later.

Passov originally joined the secret police, the GPU, in 1922. He received the Order of Lenin in 1937.

Early life

In the OGPU

Promotion and Downfall

Awards 
Order of Lenin (1937)

References 

1905 births
1940 deaths
Recipients of the Order of Lenin
NKVD officers
People executed by firing squad
People executed by the Soviet Union
Great Purge victims from Russia
Soviet Jews in the military